Miss India Worldwide 2008 was the 17th edition of the international beauty pageant. The final was held in Johannesburg, South Africa on  February 23, 2008. About 20 countries were represented in the pageant. Shagun Sarabhai  of India was crowned as the winner at the end of the event.

Results

Special awards

Delegates

 – Cassandra Fernandez
 – Uppekha Jain
 – Ashley Singh
 – Divya Ranganathan
 – Shagun Sarabhai
 – Laila Ryan
 – Racquel Baghaloo
 – Zohra Adam
 – Aisha Tayub
 – Sarina Sookeea
 – Rashi Singh
 – Suraya Baboeram Pandaij
 – Uttara Iyer
 – Sahira Binte Rashim
 – Sabeeha Husain
 – Dasuni Chathurika
 – Vanita Singh
 – Leanna Chadee
 – Suma Bhattacharya
 – Richa Gangopadhyay

References

External links
http://www.worldwidepageants.com/

2008 beauty pageants